Colin Edward 'Col' Austen (2 December 1920 – 3 October 1995) was an Australian rules footballer who played for the Hawthorn Football Club and Richmond Football Club in the Victorian Football League (VFL).

Austen made his senior VFL debut for Hawthorn in 1941 and played until 1943 and from 1946 to 1949. He then played for Richmond from 1950 to 1952. He served as a signalman in the Australian Army during the Second World War.

Austen tied with South Melbourne's Ron Clegg for the 1949 Brownlow Medal but was not awarded it based on the 'countback' system in place at that time.  The League later changed the system for tied results and, in 1989, he was awarded the medal retrospectively.

Hawthorn Football Club started 1950 in turmoil, Col Austen had sided with outgoing captain-coach Alec Albiston who was angry as he was told by a member of the board that he remain as captain. The club had appointed Bob McCaskill as coach and he wanted Kevin Curran to be captain. A huge internal split occurred, the board sided with the new coach and gave Albiston and Austen open clearances. Austen was cleared to Richmond and played 51 games from 1950 to 1952.

He was Captain/Coach of the Richmond Seconds side from 1953 to 1955, winning the competition's best and fairest, the Gardiner Medal, in 1953. He led the Tigers' seconds to the 1954 and 1955 Seconds premierships.

Finally he went to Box Hill in the VFA as Captain/Coach in 1956 and non-playing coach from 1957 to 1959. He coached Box Hill to its first two Finals appearances in the VFA, 3rd place in 1956 and 4th place in 1958. He also coached the VFA's representative side in 1958.

Austen was made a Life Member of the Richmond Football Club shortly before his death in 1995.

The 'Col Austen Memorial Trophy' is awarded each year to the winning team in the first Hawthorn vs Richmond match of the regular AFL season.

Since 2001 the Box Hill Football Club, now a member of the Victorian Football League and aligned to AFL Club Hawthorn, has annual presented the 'Col Austen Trophy' to its best and fairest player.

Honours and achievements

Playing honours 
Richmond
 2× VFL seconds premiership player: 1954, 1955

Individual
 Brownlow Medal: 1949
 Hawthorn best and fairest: 1949
 2× VFL seconds premiership captain: 1954, 1955
 Gardiner Medal: 1953
 Hawthorn Team of the Century

Coaching honours 
Richmond
 2× VFL seconds premiership coach: 1954, 1955

Hall of Fame/Life memberships 
 Hawthorn life member
 Richmond life member

Footnotes

References 
 Blair, L. (2005) The Immortals, John Wiley & Sons: Brisbane. .

 Hogan P: The Tigers Of Old, Richmond FC, (Melbourne), 1996.

External links
 World War Two Service Record: Signalman Colin Edward Austen (VX138844).
 World War Two Nominal Roll Record: Signalman Colin Edward Austen (VX138844).
 Boyles Football Photos: Col Austen.

1920 births
1995 deaths
Military personnel from Melbourne
Hawthorn Football Club players
Richmond Football Club players
Brownlow Medal winners
Peter Crimmins Medal winners
Box Hill Football Club players
Box Hill Football Club coaches
Kew Football Club players
Australian rules footballers from Melbourne
Australian Army personnel of World War II
Australian Army soldiers
People from Kew, Victoria